The Great Australians was an Australian political party. The party was founded in 2003 by John James Cumming then led by John Rivett, a Queensland businessman who has started and run many businesses. Its policies included the institution of a 2% "Spending Tax" on all spending made by individuals and companies and the abolition of income tax and the goods and services tax, the reinstitution of national service (i.e. conscription into the military), the abolition of Double Tax Conventions and reinstituting trade protection and the nationalisation of infrastructure. It stood two candidates in the Senate in both New South Wales and Queensland at the 2004 election, as well as candidates in House of Representatives seats who attracted a total of 0.02% of the national primary vote, or approximately 2,824 votes nationwide. The party was deregistered in 2006.

Policies
 Abolishing income tax.
 Making tax rules apply equally to foreign transactions and companies as Australian ones.
 Protectionism.
 Reducing the power of organisations like the WTO, World Bank and the IMF in Australia.
 The establishment of an "Australian People's Bank" to loan money at low rates to small businesses.
 A ban on genetically modified organisms.
 Forced full Australian ownership of Australian network infrastructure (like telecommunications, railways, water and roads), 50% ownership of all mines and less than 50% ownership of all media.
 Using dole workers to eradicate major plant and animal pests.
 Reduced insurance costs for local governments and community groups.
 Government investment in utilising non-fossil fuel energy resources.
 Allowing citizen initiated referendums.
 Increasing the amount of manufacturing in Australia.
 Increased funding for the Australian Broadcasting Corporation and Special Broadcasting Service.

References

External links
Australian Electoral Commission registration record

Defunct political parties in Australia
Political parties established in 2003
2003 establishments in Australia